Fratelli e sorelle, internationally released as Brothers and Sisters, is an Italian drama film directed by Pupi Avati. It was entered in the 1992 Venice Film Festival. For her performance in this film, Paola Quattrini won a Nastro d'Argento for Best supporting Actress.

Cast 
Stefano Accorsi as Matteo
Anna Bonaiuto as Gloria
Paola Quattrini as  Lea
Lidia Broccolino as  Elsa
Franco Nero as  Franco
Matthew Buzzel as  Scott
Lino Capolicchio as  Aldo
Luciano Federico as  Francesco
Consuelo Ferrara

References

External links

 

1992 films
Italian drama films
Films directed by Pupi Avati
Films set in the United States
Films scored by Riz Ortolani
1992 drama films
1990s Italian films